Pedro Opaso Letelier (July 20, 1876 – April 9, 1957) was a Chilean politician and provisional vice president of Chile in 1931.

He was born in Talca, the son of Ursicino Opaso and Margarita Letelier. He completed his studies in his native city, and then attended the Universidad de Chile, where he became a physician. He started his political career as the first mayor of the city of Río Claro. In 1920 Opaso was named minister in several occasions as a representative of the Democratic Liberal Party.  He was elected a deputy for Curicó (1921–1924) and a Senator for Talca (1924–1930) and Talca, Linares and Curico (1930–1932).

At the time of the collapse of the first administration of Carlos Ibáñez del Campo in 1931, he was the President of the Senate. As such he took over as provisional vice president. He assumed on July 26, and that same night he formed his cabinet, headed by Juan Esteban Montero as interior minister and Pedro Blanquier, the other key player, as Finance minister.

When the ministers arrived on the next morning, Opaso resigned by decree on Montero. His entire administration had lasted less than 24 hours. The speed he demonstrated to get rid of the power earned him the nickname of The Relayer, that accompanied him till his death.

After his very brief administration, he was elected Senator for Curicó, Talca, Maule y Linares (1933–1949) and again President of the Senate in 1944. He died in Santiago in 1957.

References 

1876 births
1957 deaths
People from Talca
Chilean people of French descent
Liberal Democratic Party (Chile, 1893) politicians
United Liberal Party (Chile) politicians
Liberal Party (Chile, 1849) politicians
Chilean Ministers of Defense
Presidents of the Senate of Chile
Members of the Chamber of Deputies of Chile